This is a list of the moths of family Saturniidae that are found in Canada. It also acts as an index to the species articles and forms part of the full List of moths of Canada.

Following the species name, there is an abbreviation that indicates the Canadian provinces or territories in which the species can be found.

Western Canada
BC = British Columbia
AB = Alberta
SK = Saskatchewan
MB = Manitoba
YT = Yukon
NT = Northwest Territories
NU = Nunavut

Eastern Canada
ON = Ontario
QC = Quebec
NB = New Brunswick
NS = Nova Scotia
PE = Prince Edward Island
NF = Newfoundland
LB = Labrador

Subfamily Ceratocampinae
Anisota finlaysoni Riotte, 1969-QC, ON
Anisota manitobensis McDunnough, 1921-MB
Anisota senatoria (Smith, 1797)-QC, ON
Anisota stigma (Fabricius, 1775)-ON
Anisota virginiensis (Drury, 1773)-NS, PE, NB, QC, ON, MB
Dryocampa rubicunda (Fabricius, 1793)-NS, PE, NB, QC, ON
Eacles imperialis (Drury, 1773)-QC, ON
Syssphinx bicolor (Harris, 1841)-ON

Subfamily Hemileucinae
Automeris io (Fabricius, 1775)-QC, ON, MB
Hemileuca eglanterina (Boisduval, 1852)-AB, BC
Hemileuca hera (Harris, 1841)-SK, AB, BC
Hemileuca nevadensis Stretch, 1872-MB, SK
Hemileuca nuttalli (Strecker, 1875)-BC

Subfamily Saturniinae
Callosamia angulifera (Walker, 1855)-ON
Callosamia promethea (Drury, 1773)-NB, QC, ON, MB
Hyalophora cecropia (Linnaeus, 1758)-NS, PE, NB, QC, ON, MB, SK, AB
Hyalophora columbia (Smith, 1865)-NS, PE, NB, QC, ON, MB, SK, AB, BC
Hyalophora euryalus (Boisduval, 1855)-BC
Samia cynthia (Drury, 1773)-ON
Actias luna (Linnaeus, 1758)-NS, PE, NB, QC, ON, MB, SK
Antheraea polyphemus (Cramer, 1776)-NS, PE, NB, QC, ON, MB, SK, AB, BC

External links
Moths of Canada at the Canadian Biodiversity Information Facility

Canada